Woe to the Young (Greek: Αλίμονο στους νέους) is a Greek 1961 film loosely based on the myth of Faust.

Plot
The story concerns a rich old man named Andreas, who wants to be young again so as to marry a young girl, that makes a deal with the Devil. He becomes young but poor and the little money he has he spends. Moreover, the girl - after her mother's coercion - rejects him and wounds up marrying another rich old man. The film ends with Andreas waking up, realizing this was all but a dream.

Cast

Dimitris Horn ..... Andreas
Maro Kontou ..... Rita
Smaro Stefanidou ..... Eleni
Andreas Douzos  ..... Manolis
Giorgos Velentzas ..... doctor
Spyros Mousouris ..... Agisilaos
Nikos Fermas ..... junkman
Yvoni Vladimirou ..... maid

External links

1960s Greek-language films
1961 films
Greek speculative fiction films
Films scored by Manos Hatzidakis